The Ukrainian Autocephalous Orthodox Church (UAOC;  (UAPTs)) was one of the three major Eastern Orthodox churches in Ukraine. Ukrainian Autocephalous Orthodox Church began in 1917 during dissolution of the Russian Empire as part of Ukrainian independence movement and in order to restore the Ukrainian Orthodox Church that existed in the Polish-Lithuanian Commonwealth in 1620–1685 and was annexed by the Moscow Patriarchate without approval of the Ecumenical Patriarchate of Constantinople.

It was reestablished for the third time in 1990, right before the fall of the Soviet Union. The UAOC, in its contemporary form, has its origins in the synod of 1921 in Kyiv, shortly after Ukraine's newly found independence. On 15 December 2018, at the Unification Council, the UAOC and the UOC-KP, along with metropolitans from the UOC-MP, unified into the Orthodox Church of Ukraine. Metropolitan Epiphany (former bishop of the UOC-KP) was elected as the new Metropolitan of Kyiv and All Ukraine.

During the UAOC and the UOC-KP's existence, only the UOC-MP enjoyed recognition by the Orthodox Christian community worldwide, until 11 October 2018, when the Ecumenical Patriarchate of Constantinople lifted the excommunication which afflicted the UAOC and the UOC-KP. It was later clarified on 2 November that the Ecumenical Patriarchate recognized neither the UAOC nor the UOC-KP as legitimate and that their respective leaders were not recognized as primates of their churches.

History

The Kyivan Metropolis was the fruit of the baptism of the Kyivan Rus in the time of Grand Prince Vladimir the Great (988 AD). Missionaries were sent from Constantinople to instruct the people in the Byzantine-Orthodox faith. Monastic life flourished, including in the famous Kyiv Monastery of the Caves, through the efforts of St. Anthony of Kiev, known as the father of Russian monasticism.

The sacking of Kyiv itself in December 1240 during the Mongol invasion led to the ultimate collapse of the Rus' state. For many of its residents, the brutality of Mongol attacks sealed the fate of many choosing to find safe haven in the North East. In 1299, the Kyivan metropolitan chair was moved to Vladimir by Metropolitan Maximus, keeping the title of Kyiv. As Vladimir-Suzdal, and later the Grand Duchy of Moscow continued to grow unhindered, the Orthodox religious link between them and Kyiv remained strong. The fall of Constantinople in 1453, allowed the once daughter church of North East, to become autocephalous, with Kyiv remaining part of the Ecumenical Patriarchate. From that moment on, the Churches of Ukraine and Russia went their own separate ways. The latter became central in the growing Russian Tsardom, attaining patriarchate in 1589, whilst the former became subject to repression and Polonization efforts, particularly after the Union of Brest in 1596. Eventually the persecution of Orthodox Ukrainians led to a massive rebellion under Bohdan Khmelnytsky, and united the Ukrainian Hetmanate with the Russian Tsardom, and in 1686, the Kyivan Metropolia came under the Moscow Patriarchate. Ukrainian clergy, for their Greek training, held key roles in the Russian Orthodox Church until the end of the 18th century.

In the wake of the breakup of the Russian Empire some national groups sought autonomy or autocephaly from Moscow. The Ukrainian Orthodox Church was proclaimed under the Ukrainian National Republic in 1917 and survived in Soviet Ukraine until the early 1930s.

Contemporary situation

The church regained state recognition in 1991, which is known as the "third resurrection" of the UAOC.  Initially it was governed from abroad by Patriarch Mstyslav (Skrypnyk). Subsequent to his death in 1993, he was succeeded by Patriarch Volodomyr. The Patriarch would, during his time as patriarch, separate from the UAOC to found the Ukrainian Orthodox Church – Kyiv Patriarchate (UOC-KP), together with Metropolitan (now Patriarch) Filaret Denysenko. Those not willing to accept this change continued the UAOC with a new primate, Patriarch Dymytriy Yarema.

On October 16, 2000, the Church Sobor in Ukraine elected Metropolitan Mefodiy (Kudriakov) of Ternopil to lead the church.

The Patriarchal Cathedral of the UAOC is the historic Church of St. Andrew the First-Called in Kyiv. It was built between 1747 and 1754 and was designed by the famous architect Bartolomeo Rastrelli. Although used for regular liturgical services of the Ukrainian Autocephalous Orthodox Church, the edifice had previously been a part of the historical park "Sofia-Kyiv." The Ukrainian government returned the church to the legal possession of the UAOC on 21 May 2008.

11 October 2018 decision of the Ecumenical Patriarchate 

On 11 October 2018, after a regular synod, the Patriarchate of Constantinople renewed an earlier decision to move towards granting autocephaly to the Ukrainian Orthodox Church. The synod also withdrew Constantinople's 332-years-old qualified acceptance of the Russian Orthodox Church's canonical jurisdiction over the Ukrainian Church contained in a letter of 1686. The synod also lifted the excommunication of Patriarch Filaret of the Ukrainian Orthodox Church – Kyiv Patriarchate (UOC-KP) and Metropolitan Makariy of the Ukrainian Autocephalous Orthodox Church (UAOC), and both bishops were "canonically reinstated to their hierarchical or priestly rank, and their faithful [...] restored to communion with the Church."

It was later clarified that Filaret was considered by the Ecumenical Patriarchate only as "the former metropolitan of Kyiv", and Makariy as "the former Archbishop of Lviv" and, on 2 November 2018, that the Ecumenical Patriarchate did not recognize neither the UAOC nor the UOC-KP as legitimate and that their respective leaders were not recognized as primates of their churches. The Ecumenical Patriarchate declared that it recognized the sacraments performed by the UOC-KP and the UAOC as valid.

Dissolution and merger with the UOC–KP into the OCU 

On 15 December 2018, the hierarchs of the UAOC decided to dissolve the UAOC, and the hierarchs of the UOC-KP decided to dissolve the UOC-KP. This was done because on the same day the Ukrainian Autocephalous Orthodox Church, the Ukrainian Orthodox Church – Kyiv Patriarchate, and some members of the Ukrainian Orthodox Church (Moscow Patriarchate) were going to merge to form the Orthodox Church of Ukraine after a unification council.

Makariy declared in an interview published on 23 May 2019 that neither the UAOC nor the UOC-KP had been dissolved: "Some government officials spoke incorrectly when they publicly declared that the Kyiv Patriarchate was liquidated." He explained that Philaret submitted only copies of documents, not the originals necessary in order to liquidate the UOC-KP. Macarius added: "When I was asked to hand over the documents for liquidation, I replied that until I see the originals from the other side, I will not turn in mine."

On 14 August 2019, the UAOC legally ceased to exist because it merged with the OCU.

On 14 December 2019, after the meeting of the enlarged Bishops' Council, held on December 14 in Kyiv on the occasion of the anniversary of the creation of the OCU, Epiphanius declared that the procedure of liquidation of the UAOC as well as the UOC-KP had been completed the day before. He added: "Such structures no longer exist. In confirmation of that, in the State Register there is marked 'activity DISCONTINUED.

Primates

1921–1936

In 1921, with the establishment of the Ukrainian Autocephalous Orthodox Church, the Metropolitan of Kyiv and All Ukraine was considered the primate of the church. This system continued until 1936 when, due to Soviet pressure, the Ukrainian Autocephalous Orthodox Church was forced into emigration, with some of its members emigrating to the United States. The primates from 1921 to 1936 were:

 Vasyl Lypkivsky, Metropolitan of Kyiv and All Ukraine (1921–1927)
 Mykola Boretsky, Metropolitan of Kyiv and All Ukraine (1927–1930) 
 Ivan Pavlovsky, Metropolitan of Kyiv and All Ukraine (1930–1936)

1942–1944

In 1942, UAOC was re-established with help of the Polish Orthodox Church during occupation of Ukraine by Nazi Germany. This period lasted till the return of the Red Army in 1944, after that the UAOC was forced to emigration for a second time due to persecutions by the Soviet regime and remained structured only in the Ukrainian diaspora.
 Polikarp (Sikorsky), Archbishop of Lutsk and Volhynia, temporary administrator (1941–1944)
 Dionizy (Waledyński), Metropolitan of Warsaw and all Poland (1923–1960), proclaimed (not enthroned) Patriarch of all Ukraine (1944–1960)

In diaspora (Europe), 1945–1990
 Polikarp (Sikorsky), former Metropolitan of Lutsk and Volhynia, Primate of UAOC in diaspora (1945–1953)
 Nikanor (Abramovych), former Archbishop of Kyiv and Chyhyryn, Primate of UAOC in diaspora (1953–1969)
 Mstyslav (Skrypnyk), Metropolitan of New York and all the USA, former Bishop of Pereyaslav, Primate of UAOC in diaspora (1969–1993)

1990–2018 

In 1990 the Ukrainian Autocephalous Orthodox Church was reinstated in Ukraine, and the Ukrainian Orthodox Church of Canada and the Ukrainian Autocephalous Orthodox Church in diaspora Metropolitan Mstyslav was enthroned as a patriarch. Since 2000, the church primate has been the Metropolitan of Kyiv and All Ukraine.
 Metropolitan Ioan (Vasyl Bodnarchuk), Metropolitan of Lviv and Galicia, former Bishop of Zhytomyr and Ovruch, Primate of UAOC (1989–1991)
 Patriarch Mstyslav (Stepan Skrypnyk), Patriarch of Kyiv and all Rus-Ukraine (1991–1993)
 Patriarch Dymytriy (Volodymyr Yarema), Patriarch of Kyiv and all Rus-Ukraine (1993–2000)
 Metropolitan Mefodiy (Valeriy Kudriakov), Metropolitan of Kyiv and All Ukraine (2000–2015)
 Metropolitan Makariy (Mykola Maletych), Metropolitan of Kyiv and All Ukraine (2015–2018)

Metropolitan Epiphany of Kyiv and All Ukraine was elected primate of the Orthodox Church of Ukraine on 15 December 2018.

See also 

2018 Moscow–Constantinople schism
Unification council of the Orthodox churches of Ukraine
Autocephaly of the Orthodox Church of Ukraine

References

External links

 Official website archive

 
Former Ukrainian Orthodox Church bodies
Independent Eastern Orthodox denominations
Eastern Orthodox Church bodies in Europe
1921 establishments in Ukraine
1942 establishments in Ukraine
1990 establishments in Ukraine
2018 disestablishments in Ukraine
Christian organizations established in 1921
Christian organizations established in 1942
Christian organizations established in 1990
Religious organizations disestablished in 2018